Tomas Andres Jones (born 3 February 1977) is a British long-distance runner. He competed in the men's 10,000 metres at the 2000 Summer Olympics.

References

1977 births
Living people
Athletes (track and field) at the 2000 Summer Olympics
British male long-distance runners
Olympic athletes of Great Britain
Place of birth missing (living people)
Sportspeople from Ceredigion